The 2018 Big South Conference men's soccer tournament, will be the 29th edition of the tournament. It determined the Big South Conference's automatic berth into the 2018 NCAA Division I Men's Soccer Championship.

Campbell won the tournament, making it their first Big South championship since 1992. It was the program's fifth overall conference championship. They defeated the two-time defending champions, Presbyterian, in the final. With the title, Campbell earned an automatic berth to the NCAA Tournament, for the first time since 2007. They played NC State in the first round, where they lost 1–4. Regular season champions, High Point, earned an at-large bid into the NCAA Tournament, making it their first ever appearance in the NCAA Tournament. There, the Panthers lost to James Madison in the first round, by a 0-3 scoreline.

Seeds

Bracket

Results

Quarterfinals

Semifinals

Final

All Tournament Team

References

External links 
 Big South Men's Soccer Tournament

2018
Tournament
Big South Conference Men's Soccer Tournament
Big South Conference Men's Soccer Tournament